George Rowley may refer to:
 George Rowley (academic) (1782–1836), Dean and Master of University College, Oxford and Vice-Chancellor of Oxford University
 George Rowley (entrepreneur) (born 1964), British entrepreneur
 George Rowley (cricketer) (1896–1953), English cricketer
 George Dawson Rowley (1822–1878), English amateur ornithologist